is a Japanese martial arts novel series written by Baku Yumemakura. The series' first part consists of 13 novels, released from July 1985 to March 2003. The second part, Shin Garōden, started in December 2006, with five volumes released by October 2020.

A manga series adaptation by Jirō Taniguchi was published from 1989 to 1990. A second manga series adaptation by Keisuke Itagaki was published from 1996 to 2010, before entering on indefinite hiatus. A prequel manga series by Itagaki, titled Garōden Boy, was published in 2004. A manga adaptation of  Shin Garōden, by Masami Nobe, was published from 2013 to 2014.

A feature film was released in January 1995. Two video games were released for the PlayStation 2: Garōden Breakblow in 2005, and Garōden Breakblow Fist or Twist in 2007.

Plot
Fighting expert Bunshichi Tanba enjoys defeating TV fighting champions and celebrities on the street until he stumbles into the underground wrestling club known as FAW (Federation of Amateur Wrestling). There, he is defeated by a wrestling world underdog and forces himself to improve before he seeks a rematch. Years later he returns better than ever and his fights attract the attention of the two "monsters" of the fighting world that are constantly in competition with each other, Makoto "the great" Tatsumi, owner of the FAW and with a power and charisma unrivaled in the ring, and "the demon of karate" Matsuo Shozan, owner of the best Karate schools in Japan and with a power and speed that is almost godlike. Both will try to recruit Tanba to their own side and Tanba will experience a fighting world like he has never seen, with friends and rivals everywhere, he must have to step to the many challenges that present in front of him, also it has the special appearance of other martial arts characters from his other fighting novel series, the gate of the lions.

Characters
Bunshichi Tanba
The main protagonist fighting to prove his strength to himself. After losing a match to Kajiwara he realized he was not as strong as he perceived himself to be and disappeared for three years in which he trained himself intensely to avenge his loss and never lose to anyone again. After avenging his defeat by Kajiwara at a FAW show, he is then approached by the Great Tatsumi & Shozan Matsuo who want to bring him to their respective sides after seeing the great potential he hides as a fighter. Later on he encounters the "fake Bunshichi" Fujimaki Jyuzo who has been defeating Hokushin fighters in order to lure him out due to the bad press he has been spreading by using Tanba's name. After fighting to a stand still and meeting two people from Fujimaki's past, he witnesses Jyohei Tsutsumi take out Yakuza gangsters who have been harassing him on the street. This brings out a desire to challenge him, which culminates in a fight organized by Tatsumi. There, Bunshichi remembers his first act of violence towards another human from years ago. The match was an "everything goes" fight which culminated when Tanba defeated Jyohei by knockout. After the Hokushinkai tournament, he set off to challenge various masters in no-rules street fights. He is currently fighting Teruo Kitaoka, who is still recovering from injuries suffered during the tournament.
Jūzō Fujimaki
Appears as a mysterious figure wearing a baseball cap and sweat suit, as a practitioner of "Takemiya Ryuu" (a hybrid of Aikido, jiu jitsu and karate). He is on the run from the authorities for savagely killing the man who raped the woman he loved, Saeko. He begins using the name "Bunshichi Tanba" to defeat various Hokushin fighters in order to draw out the real Bunshichi. They finally meet in a playground, acknowledging each other's fighting spirit, and begin fighting. After implementing various striking and submission techniques, the fight ends in a draw due to the surprise appearance of Saeko and the man he wishes to destroy, Tsutomu Himekawa, Saeko's lover. Invited by him to join in Matsuo's tournament he ambushes him in a graveyard where he reveals he cannot enter due to his status as a wanted man, later he challenges Matsuo, ending struck down by him and meets Nagata Hiroshi where he propositions to train him for the upcoming tournament. He is seen in the crowds wearing a disguise while watching Nagata fight at the competition where he reveals himself after a moment of uneasiness overtakes him. After Himekawa defeats Nagata in the finals (suffering a broken arm in the process), Fujimaki faces him for one more encounter, intentionally breaking his own arm for equality. He is again defeated by Himekawa, but not before causing Himekawa to bite his own tongue off in order to survive the "Jikaburi" a high-speed throw that planted him squarely on his head. He was on the verge of victory, but in a moment of shocking stupidity decided to attempt a flying kick, which Himekawa countered by side-stepping and slamming his head into the ground, knocking him out and snatching defeat from the jaws of victory.
Shozan Matsuo
Founder of the Hokushin School. One of the strongest characters in the Garōden series, that not even Tanba Bunshichi and Fujimaki Jyuzo could defeat him. A master karate who wishes to measure his strength. Calls himself "The Strongest of all". Wishing to fight strong opponents, he organizes a tournament with Tatsumi giving the winner a chance to challenge him. Himekawa wins the tournament, however his injuries will not allow him to fight Shozan. Matsuo uses this opportunity to showcase his skills against 2 men in an exhibition, a top Yakuza enforcer and a SWAT team officer armed with "Duralium" riot shield and billy club, defeating them both easily. Based on real life Kyokushinkai Karate fighter Mas Oyama, founder of the Kyokushinkaikan karate.
Jyohei Tsutsumi
Student of the Hokushin school. A deliveryman by day, he is a fierce fighter that awed Bunshichi with his fighting skills. Harboring a desire to fight him and with Matsuo Shozan's approval, Tatsumi organizes an everything goes fight with Tanba which ends with him defeating Jyohei by knockout. Tsutsumi is visited by Tanba in the hospital while he is recovering showing that the two have become friends.
Hiroshi Nagata
Pro wrestler and star of the FAW. He announces his intention of fighting in the tournament to the press despite some resistance from the head trainer. In order to prepare he challenges the Hokushin school by fighting several of their fighters winning the respect of Matsuo Shozan. He has a sparring match with Tsutsumi before his match with Bunshichi and is later approached by Fujimaki who helps train him for the upcoming tournament. He is also helped by Kajiwara who acting as his trainer/cornerman during the competition, he reaches the finals where his final opponent is Himekawa. During a grueling back and forth battle, Nagata landed the Ko-ou (a combination throw consisting of a flying knee to the chin turning into a knee to the back of the skull with an arm locked), dislocating Himekawa's shoulder and until that point in the manga had been a sure KO. However, this time it was not meant to be, as Himekawa recovered instantly, and while Nagata was celebrating he turned around only to be met with a Himekawa kick to the chin, knocking him out.
Teruo Kataoka
A master of "Shisei kan" karate, a crude and painful style that is based into inflicting damage on one's body to make it tougher, thanks to this painful training, he molded his body into a solid weapon that can crush concrete blocks and bend metal, he destroys his opponents on tournaments but he has never stepped into the "street fighting world". In the tournament, he is eliminated by Hikoichi Kurama by way of a suplex. He is currently fighting Tanba in a no-rules street fight.
Makoto Tatsumi/Great Tatsumi
Originally from Brazil, this man, half Brazilian-half Japanese, was the adopted son of a cruel wrestler that enjoyed torturing him. He later confronted the man in a restaurant bathroom and castrated him with his bare hands, before leaving the man to commit seppuku. He became a pro wrestler and soon became bored with the theatrics and fakeness of pro wrestling and stepped into the "underground stage" in the US, where human beings were treated as cockfighters. He met Crybaby Sakura and after a series of encounters, he earned a huge sum of money and started under his company "Toyo Puroresu" the Federation of Amateur Wrestling (FAW) currently he challenged Matsuo Shozan to a big "five on five" Legendary battle. He is based on real-life pro wrestling legend Antonio Inoki.
Crybaby Sakura 
A figure from Great Tatsumi's past, Crybaby Sakura was the boss of the no-holds-barred mixed martial arts ring that Tatsumi fought in as part of his quest to become a great fighter. When Tatsumi defeated every opponent put in front of him, Sakura decided to step back into the ring himself. A colossal man, easily seven feet tall, Sakura was a terrifying and bizarre opponent. He had been blinded at age fifteen by his mother, who gouged his eyes out in a fit of rage after a wealthy man she had been courting left her. Living in the manor the man had gifted them, Sakura discovered that his mother, now catatonic with grief, only smiled when she watched him exercise, causing him to spend his youth using the room his mother lived the rest of her days in as a gym. In order to compensate for his blindness, Sakura's other senses now border on the superhuman, and his harsh training and bizarre lifestyle-he claims to eat, sweat and otherwise excrete twenty times more than a normal man, sans tears-make him a monstrous and almost invincible opponent. He reveals during his fight with Tatsumi that in all of the fights he has been in, whenever he is knocked out, a door appears before him that will not open, and believes Tatsumi is the man that can open it for him. He nearly kills Tatsumi before being defeated in an upset victory, after which he cries for the first time in years. He later has Tatsumi snap his neck, allowing the door to open and letting him reunite with his (idealized) mother in a sort of afterlife, having been restored to a pre-pubescent and non-blind version of himself. Tatsumi quietly leaves as he sees a vision of his greatest rival happily playing with his mother among the stars.
Ryuji Kubo
Tanba's best friend and sparring partner, he looks up to Bunshichi and considers him his Sensei even though he went missing for 3 years he was more than welcome at Tanba's return and continued their friendship. In Tanba's absence he supplemented his own training at a small branch of Houkushinkaikan but never bothered to advance himself in rank by formally joining the school, he was still of course able to easily defeat everyone else at this Dojo but felt unfulfilled with the training without Tanba's guidance
Toshio Kajiwara
FAW wrestler that is the first to defeat Bunshichi Tanba in the beginning of the manga, 3 years later at a return wrestling match to Japan he is defeated by Tanba rather quickly thus avenging his loss. After the Tanba vs Jyohei match he was scheduled to fight a judo fighter but was defeated by a rising pro wrestling star in the locker room Hikoichi Kurama by use of the Giant Swing. He is later Helping Nagata prepare by helping him train for the tournament and acting as his cornerman.
Tsutomu Himekawa
A disciple of Shozan Matsuo who tried to fight him and got his arm broken. But, Tsutomu did not lose the fight. It ended in a draw to be resolved later. His speed and accuracy are unmatched and he fights and wins in beautiful style, just like an ice skater or a ballet dancer would perform their skills. He is the one that aims to defeat Shozan and has never lost a fight. He entered the tournament to finally get the chance to challenge his teacher winning all of his matches easily without much of a struggle and is currently in the finals where he will face FAW wrestler Hiroshi Nagata. He defeats Nagata in the finals only to be faced again by Fujimaki, where he is pushed to his limit, trading multiple full-strength blows before winning via countering Fujimaki's flying kick attempt by slamming his head into the ground. Due to his injuries, however, he is unable to face Shozan Matsuo.
Hikoichi Kurama
A rising pro wrestling star,Great Tatsumi's prized pupil whom he considers can carry on his legacy, incredibly strong and a fast learner, though young, brash and arrogant, often before any of his training or matches he is receiving phone calls from one of his many girlfriends berating him on not spending enough time with them or suspicion of another woman,Tatsumi has him train for Matsuo's tournament by sparring 3 Pro Wrestling trainees with karate experience and he defeats them effortlessly, after which Tatsumi has a master of a more lethal and ancient form of karate spar with him, though Kurama is defeated in this match he picks up and learns several techniques quickly and though it would be assumed he would recover bloodied and beaten he heads off straight away to meet up with one of his girlfriends. He later tries to make himself known to the public by competing in Tatsumi's fighting event by knocking out Kajiwara in the locker room to face his opponent.

Media

Novel
Written by Baku Yumemakura, the first volume of Garōden was released on July 20, 1985. The first part finished with the 13th volume, released on March 4, 2003. The first novel of the second part, titled , was released on December 12, 2006. As of October 16, 2020, five volumes have been released.

Manga
A manga series adaptation by Jiro Taniguchi was published in Asahi Sonorama's Shishiō magazine from 1989 to 1990, and collected in a single volume released on June 30, 1990.

Another manga series adaptation by Keisuke Itagaki started in the August 1996 issue of 's manga magazine Monthly Comic Birz. Schola collected its chapters in five tankōbon volumes, released from December 1996 to February 1999. Monthly Comic Birz ceased publication after the May 1999 issue, and the series was transferred to Kodansha's Young Magazine Uppers in 1999. the magazine ceased publication in 2004, and the manga was transferred to Kodansha's Evening on February 8, 2004. Its last chapter in the magazine was published on October 12, 2010, and the series was put on indefinite hiatus. Kodansha released 25 volumes from August 6, 1999, to December 12, 2010. Akita Shoten started republishing the series on April 7, 2011; for this reason, the first two chapters were published in Weekly Shōnen Champion on March 31 and April 7 of the same year. 26 volumes were released until August 8, 2012.

Related manga
A prequel manga series by Itakagi, titled , was serialized in Kodansha's shōnen manga magazine Weekly Shōnen Magazine from January 14 to July 7, 2004; two volumes were released by Kodansha on July 15 and August 26 of the same year. Akita Shoten re-released both volumes on September 17, 2012.

A manga adaptation of Shing Garōden by Masami Nobe, was serialized in Weekly Shōnen Champion from February 14, 2013, to May 29, 2014. Akita Shoten released six volumes from June 7, 2013, to July 8, 2014.

Film
A feature film adaptation directed by Masato Sasaki premiered on January 25, 1995.

Video games
Two video game adaptations, published by Entertainment Software Publishing (ESP), were released for the PlayStation 2. The first game, was released on November 17, 2005, and the second, was released on March 15, 2007.

Reception
Volume 20 of the manga ranked 9th in the May 9–15, 2007 Japanese comic ranking. Volume 23 ranked 15th in the April 19–26, 2009 ranking, selling 41,216 copies.

Notes

References

External links
  
  
 

1990s Japanese films
1990s action films
2005 video games
2007 video games
Akita Shoten manga
Films based on Japanese novels
Japan-exclusive video games
Japanese action films
Japanese novels adapted into films
Kodansha manga
Live-action films based on manga
Martial arts anime and manga
Martial arts books
Martial arts video games
Novel series
PlayStation 2 games
PlayStation 2-only games
Seinen manga
Shōnen manga
Video games based on novels
Video games developed in Japan